Sports in Indonesia are popular from both the participation and spectating aspect. Some popular sports in Indonesia are football, volleyball, basketball, badminton, and the native Indonesian martial art pencak silat. Badminton is arguably Indonesia's most successful sport. Indonesia has won gold medals in badminton in every Olympic Games since the sport was first introduced to the Olympics in 1992, with the exception of the 2012 Summer Olympics. Indonesia became the first grand winner in Badminton Olympics back then 1992. Indonesia regularly participates in the Thomas Cup, Uber Cup, and Sudirman Cup badminton championships, then became the first nation in history to complete those three titles. Indonesia also regularly participates in regional multi-events sport, such as the Southeast Asian Games, Asian Games, and Olympic Games. Indonesia is one of the major sport powerhouses in the Southeast Asian region, winning the Southeast Asian Games 10 times since 1977.

Sporting events in Indonesia are organised by the Indonesian National Sport Committee (Komite Olahraga Nasional Indonesia or KONI). The organisation, along with the Indonesian government, have set the National Sports Day on 9 September. Indonesia hosts the Pekan Olahraga Nasional multi-sport event every four years. Athletes from all provinces of Indonesia participate in this event, with hosting tally are distributed among Indonesian provinces.

History

In traditional Indonesian culture, there is no actual concept for physical exercise as the counterpart of modern sport. Native Indonesians usually linked the physical activities to tribal practices; mainly for ritual, art, physical fitness and martial purposes. The war dances and ritual combat among Indonesian tribes are the earliest example of ritualised physical exercise in Indonesia. Some of native Indonesian rituals are resembling sport, such as lompat batu (leaping the stone) tradition among Nias male youth as part of coming of age ritual, that resembles hurdling and long jump in athletics. Also Madurese karapan sapi and Minang pacu jawi (bull racing) that are similar to chariot race. Dragon boat, canoe and kayak race are virtually everyday activities among Indonesians that lives on the bank of major rivers or on distant islands.

In the 9th century the images of archery, described as princely court activities among nobility in ancient Java, can be found on bas-reliefs of Javanese candis. Archery is suggested as one of Indonesia's classical sport, and one of its famous rendering came from Prambanan temple as part of Ramayana story and later rendered as one of the icon of the Jakarta's 1962 Asian Games, also as the symbol of Gelora Bung Karno Stadium.

Pencak silat is the example of Indonesian native martial art that turned into competitive combat sport. Several Indonesian dances demonstrated repetitive movements that similar to physical exercise. Indonesian traditional social dances such as poco-poco dance from North Sulawesi and sajojo from Papua are adopted as senam kesegaran jasmani (musical calisthenics) today popular across Indonesia.

The modern concept of sport was introduced during colonial Dutch East Indies period. During these times football and badminton has reached Indonesia and become popular sport among Indonesian people ever since. After Indonesian independence, National Sports Committee of Indonesia was established in 1946 to unite the various satellite sports associations that was created within the regencies, then sports facilities were constructed in Indonesia, such as Ikada Stadium (1951—1962). During Sukarno reign, there is a desire to utilise sport as the means for uniting Indonesian people, establishing national pride as well as promoting sports in Indonesia. As the result the Gelora Bung Karno Stadium surrounded by sporting complex facilities were constructed in 1962 to host the fourth Asian Games held in Jakarta. Today in international stage, Indonesia is successful in badminton and also has been one of the major multi-event sports powerhouse in Southeast Asia.

Popular Sports
Many sports were imported, some were developed from native Indonesian traditional sports and became popular in Indonesia.

Badminton

Badminton is Indonesia's most successful sport, described by the New York Times as "part of the national identity". Indonesia has won gold medal in badminton in every Olympic Games since the sport was first introduced to the Olympics in 1992, except in 2012. In 1992, it came from Alan Budikusuma in men's singles, and Susi Susanti in women's singles. In 1996, Ricky Subagja and Rexy Mainaky got the gold medal in men's doubles. In 2000, Candra Wijaya and Tony Gunawan won the gold medal in men's doubles. In 2004, Taufik Hidayat won a gold medal in men's singles. In 2008, Indonesia won a gold medal through men's doubles, Markis Kido and Hendra Setiawan. In 2016, Indonesia won a gold medal through mixed doubles, Liliyana Natsir and Tontowi Ahmad. In 2020, Indonesia won a gold medal through women’s doubles, Greysia Polii and Apriyani Rahayu.

Indonesian badminton athletes have played in various international badminton tournaments in Indonesia, China, Korea, Denmark, Malaysia, India, Japan, England and many other tournaments, including Summer Olympics ever since the sport was introduced as a demonstration sport in the 1972 Summer Olympics and its official introduction in the 1992 Summer Olympics. Rudy Hartono is an Indonesian legendary badminton player, who has succeeded to win All England titles seven times in a row.

Out of all participating nations, Indonesia won the most titles in the Thomas Cup (World Men’s Team Badminton Championships), winning 14 titles in 29 appearances. In addition to that, Indonesia has won the Uber Cup (World Women’s Team Badminton Championships) 3 times and Sudirman Cup (World Mixed Team Badminton Championships) once. Indonesia also held its own international badminton tournament, the most prestigious is Indonesia Open that has been held annually since 1982 and Indonesia Masters which has been held since 2010.

Football

Football has become one of the most popular sports in Indonesia since the country's independence, even though it had virtually no presence in the country before then. in Indonesia, this phenomenon is most often ascribed to general worldwide popularity of the sport, which carried over into Indonesia following its rapid urbanization. It is played widely, both professionally and as recreation. Indonesia Super League, the Indonesian domestic league is popular. Some of the major teams include: Persib Bandung, Persebaya Surabaya, PSM Makassar, PSMS Medan, Persija Jakarta, PSIS Semarang, Sriwijaya FC, Persipura Jayapura, Bali United and Arema Malang. The national body is the Football Association of Indonesia (PSSI).

The Indonesian football league started around 1930 in the Dutch colonial era. In 1993, PSSI combined the existing 2 amateur competitions to be a single professional competition for football clubs, known as the Indonesian Football League (Liga Indonesia). Starting from 2008-09 season onwards, the competition format changed into a more common system that also being used in most European football leagues. The name also changed into Indonesia Super League.

On the international stage, Indonesia experienced limited success despite being the first Asian team to qualify for the FIFA World Cup in 1938 as Dutch East Indies. In 1956, the football team played in the Olympics and played a hard-fought draw against USSR. On the continent level, Indonesia won the bronze medal once in football in the 1958 Asian Games. Indonesia's first appearance in Asian Cup was back in 1996. The Indonesian national team has always qualified for the Asian Cup in 2000, 2004 and 2007 AFC Asian Cup, however unable to move through next stage. Indonesia will host the 2023 FIFA U-20 World Cup after being awarded the competition over the South American countries of Brazil and Peru; the Indonesia Under-20 football team automatically qualified for the 2023 tournament as host.

Basketball
Basketball is one of the most popular sports especially among Indonesian youth. Liga Bola Basket Nasional is the pre-eminent men's basketball league in Indonesia, competed by 10 clubs across the country. The competition started as Indonesian Basketball League (IBL) in 2003. In 2010, Perbasi appointed DBL Indonesia to handle the competition and changed the league's name to National Basketball League (NBL).

Today, Indonesia and the Philippines are the major basketball powerhouses in Southeast Asia. The Indonesia national basketball team's biggest success has been gold at the 1996 Southeast Asian Basketball Championship.

Indonesia will host the official 2021 Asian Basketball Championship and most notably, the country will co-host the 2023 Basketball World Cup, together with the Philippines and Japan. Although lately basketball has been proven as the most famous sport. Even their national team were able to be invited to several competitions. Several matches will be played in Jakarta.

Additionally, a whole basketball league is dedicated to junior and senior students throughout Indonesia. This league is called DBL, which stands for Development Basketball League.

Volleyball
Volleyball in Indonesia has been played since the Dutch colonial era. After being played as an official sport at the 1951 National Sports Week, the Indonesian Volleyball Federation was formed in 1955 and became the parent sport of volleyball in Indonesia. Until now, volleyball has become one of the popular sports played by the Indonesian people, both as study material at school, to fill their free time, and as a means of competition. The volleyball competition in Indonesia has been running, at least since the 1980s, as a professional competition for domestic volleyball athletes. Indonesia men's national volleyball team has also made several achievements in international competitions.

E-sports

There is a significant competitive video game scene in Indonesia, with eSports tournaments for mobile games such as Vainglory being held in Jakarta. The 2018 Asian Games, held in Indonesia, included a demonstration event for Esports.

Pencak silat

Silat is an Indonesian native martial art, and pencak silat is an umbrella term for the indigenous martial arts created in Indonesia. The leading organisation of pencak silat in Indonesia is IPSI (Ikatan Pencak silat Indonesia meaning Organization for Indonesian pencak silat). The liaison body for international pencak silat is the International Pencak Silat Association or PERSILAT (Persekutuan Pencak Silat Antara Bangsa). There is many perguruan (schools) and styles of pencak silat in Indonesia.

Pencak silat has become one of sporting event in Pekan Olahraga Nasional and Southeast Asian Games with Indonesia as appear as one of the leading force in this sport. This martial art sport is also popular in Malaysia, Singapore, Thailand and Vietnam.

Cycling
Indonesia host some international road cycling tours; such as the annual Tour de Indonesia, Tour de Singkarak and Tour de East Java. Inspired by European Tour de France, these tours is one of the esteemed cycling event in Southeast Asian region and has attracted local as well as foreign cycling teams. Tour d'Indonesia usually started in Jakarta, across inland Java all the way eastward to Bali, while Tour de Singkarak is held in West Sumatra touring around Lake Singkarak. In track cycling numbers, Indonesia is also one of the strongest in the region and often won gold medals in Southeast Asia Games. Indonesia have world class velodromes in Rawamangun, Jakarta; and Kutai Kartanegara, East Kalimantan, hailed as one of the best velodrome in Southeast Asia.

For non-athlete common Indonesians, riding bicycle is considered as the mode of transportation as well as a recreational and leisure sport. It is quite popular in Indonesia, especially during Car-Free Days in several cities. During weekends, especially around Saturday and Sunday morning, cyclist flocking Jakarta's main avenue such as Jalan Thamrin and Jalan Sudirman that is closed from cars, municipal authorities invited locals to have their sports and activities on the street. The Bike-to-Work community was established in Indonesia in 2005 to promote cycling as a cheap, healthy, and environment friendly mode of transportation to the workplace.

Extreme cycling, such as Mountain biking and urban Freestyle BMX is also popular among youth in main cities of Indonesia.

Boxing
Boxing is a popular combative sport spectacle in Indonesia. Some famous Indonesian boxers include Ellyas Pical, three times IBF Super flyweight champion; Nico Thomas, Muhammad Rachman, and Chris John.

Sepak takraw

Sepak takraw spread from China to the Indonesian archipelago, the game is believed to have evolved from cuju, a game similar to association football that was used as military training. In Indonesia, Sepak Takraw is also known as Sepak Raga in the local language in Indonesia. In Sulawesi, the traditional Bugis football game is called "Raga" (the player is called "Pa'Raga"). Some of the men playing the "Raga" circle in a group, the ball is passed from one to the other and the man who kicks the highest ball is the winner. "Raga" is also played for fun by demonstrating several tricks, such as kicking the ball and placing it on the player's head with the handle of the tengkolok bugis (Bugis headgear similar to a Malay tanjak).

After Sepak takraw was developed into modern competitive sport in 1940s with exact rules and scoring systems, Indonesia has become one of major sepak takraw power in the region, competing against Thailand and Malaysian teams.

Surfing

Surfing in Indonesia is a small minority sport, we can find the most popular Indonesian surfers at Pangandaran, Banyuwangi, Lombok, and Bali.
The most famous surfer from Indonesia right now is Dede Suryana.

Sports leagues in Indonesia

Competitions

The Pekan Olahraga Nasional (National Sports Week) are held every four years. Indonesia also participates in international sporting events such as the Olympic Games (see Indonesia at the Olympics). the Asian Games and the South East Asian Games (SEA Games). 2018 Asian Games was held at Jakarta, Palembang, and some other venues in the provinces of West Java and Banten.

Hosted Games

All time medal count 

Defunct

 For ASEAN University Games, Games of the New Emerging Forces, and FESPIC Games data is not complete.
 at the Pan Arab Games Indonesia is an invitational country.
 As 2022

Sport events in Indonesia 

2007 AFC Asian Cup, AFF Championship, and 2023 FIBA Basketball World Cup Hosted  with other country.

Indonesia Seven Summits Expedition
On 8 July 2011 08:35am local time four Indonesian students have reached the peak of the Mount McKinley. So, the mission to scale all of the Seven Summits in Indonesia Seven Summits Expedition have been accomplished. All of the four students are the first Indonesians getting the title of the Seven Summiteers.

See also

 Liga 1 (Indonesia)
 Indonesian Basketball League
 Proliga
 Indonesian Futsal League
 Indonesian martial arts

References

External links
 Indonesian Sports Committee